Michael John Prendergast  (born 3 March 1941), known professionally as Mike Pender, is an English singer and guitarist. He was an original founding member of Merseybeat group the Searchers. He is best known as the lead vocalist on many hit singles by the Searchers, including the song "Needles and Pins" and "What Have They Done to the Rain?".

Biography 

Liverpool-native Pender pursued a solo career after leaving the Searchers and released one solo single before forming his current band, Mike Pender's Searchers who perform songs from his many years with the Searchers in addition to all-new material and a blend of popular rock standards by classic artists such as Buddy Holly, the Drifters and Roy Orbison.

In his early years, Pender worked at a printing company (Charles Birchall & Sons (Liverpool) Ltd.) as a day job in between playing nightly gigs with the Searchers. According to Pender, he is responsible for choosing the band name for the Searchers. "The band was founded by myself and John McNally. In 1957 John and I went to see the film The Searchers starring John Wayne. I was an ardent Western fan and so I dragged John along with me to see it. I take the credit for choosing the name 'the Searchers' and for co-founding the band in its original form". Some years ago, Mike Pender claimed to be a member of two fictitious groups he played in before his years with the Searchers.

Over the years, some of Pender's personal guitars have included his Gibson ES-345 with sunburst finish, the Burns Tri-Sonic in the colour of red with three pick-ups and the twelve-string Rickenbacker Rose Morris model 1993 coloured in a fireglo finish with deluxe features including the f-hole rather than the slash sound hole. Other guitars he has played include the Aria twelve-string guitar, his Danelectro Bellzouki twelve-string made from wood and hardboard, and the solid Rickenbacker 450/12 in an elegant mapleglo finish, which had a converter comb, which allowed it to be converted into either a 6-string or 12-string guitar. Pender's Rose Morris model 1993 was stolen several years ago; it had been used on many of the Searchers' studio recordings in addition to numerous live performances.

After the Searchers recorded the singles "Sweets for My Sweet" and "Sugar and Spice", Pender took over lead vocal duties from Tony Jackson. During the late 1970s, the Searchers were signed by Seymour Stein's Sire Records and recorded two modernised albums, including "The Searchers" and "Play for Today", which was retitled "Love's Melodies" outside the United Kingdom. The Searchers recorded what would become the final single with Pender, I Don't Want to Be the One.

Pender left the Searchers in 1985 to pursue a solo career and in 1988 joined an all-star rock band known as the Corporation a.k.a. the "Travelling Wrinklies", whose name was a parody of the popular rock group Traveling Wilburys. That band included Pender, Brian Poole, Clem Curtis, Tony Crane and Reg Presley, lead singer of the Troggs. With the Searchers continuing to perform, Pender was replaced by a new vocalist, Spencer James.

Selecting a group of talented musicians, Pender sought to re-create the unique sound that popularised the Searchers. Forming the band "Mike Pender's Searchers", they began touring in the late 1980s and re-recorded the Searchers' hits plus four new tracks. Various CDs, featuring these new tracks and the re-recordings, have been released in various countries around the world. Mike Pender's Searchers continue to book new shows and tour, targeting Britain, Australia, the U.S., the Netherlands, Germany, Belgium, Sweden, Denmark and the United Arab Emirates. In 1994 Mike Pender's Searchers were the very first 1960s band to be invited to play on board the QE2 as part of the world famous liner's 25th anniversary celebrations.

Pender retired from performing in December 2022. His last show was at the Royal Concert Hall in Nottingham as part of the Sensational Sixties Experience which also happened to be his 59th wedding anniversary.

Honours 
Pender was appointed Member of the Order of the British Empire (MBE) in the 2020 New Year Honours for services to music.

Selected discography

CD albums 
That Was Then This is Now
Sweets for My Sweet
Mike Pender's Searchers Live!
Best of Mike Pender's Searchers
Needles & Pins
The Best of the Searchers (new versions of the Searchers' classic hits)
Fab '60s
Rock N' Roll Reunion: 1964

DVDs

CD compilations (various artists) 
 Rolling Back the Years: The '60s
 Top Ten Hits of the Sixties: Your Favourite Sixties Supergroups
 UK No. 1 Hits of the '60s CD
 Merseybeat – Mike Pender's Searchers with Billy J. Kramer and the Fourmost (1CD)
 The Greatest Hits of Tug Boat Records
 The British '60s Volume 3
 Rolling Back the Years the '60s
 The Best of the Love Songs
 Hits of the '60s
 Dreamtime: Volume 2
 Fab Sixties Boxed set
 Hits of the '60s
 Class of 64 (One Track Falling Apart at the Seams features Mike Pender)
 Hits of the Searchers/Gerry & the Pacemakers – British '60s CD featuring 10 cuts from Mike Pender's Searchers and 10 cuts from Gerry Marsden
 The Corporation – Ain't Nothing But a House Party 7" and 12" single with Mike Pender, (of the Searchers), Brian Poole (of Brian Poole & the Tremeloes), Clem Curtis (of the Foundations), Tony Crane (of the Merseybeats/the Merseys) and Reg Presley (of the Troggs)
 Back To the Future – recordings of '90s songs by '60s artists Mike Pender performs Weather With You (Crowded House)

Literature 
Mike Pender: The Search for Myself (Malpas: Genuine Article, 2014)

References

External links 

1941 births
Living people
English pop singers
English autobiographers
English rock guitarists
Lead guitarists
English rock singers
English male singer-songwriters
English male guitarists
The Searchers (band) members
Members of the Order of the British Empire
The Corporation (English band) members